The Sexual Offences Act 1993 (c.30) is an Act of the Parliament of the United Kingdom that abolished the presumption that a boy under the age of fourteen is incapable of sexual intercourse.  Under the Sexual Offences Act 2003, if a boy under the age of fourteen intentionally penetrates a woman's vagina with his penis without her consent, he is guilty of rape.  Prior to the passage of the Sexual Offences Act 1993, and under the former Sexual Offences Act 1956, the boy would have been presumed physically incapable of penantrating the woman's vagina with his penis, and could not have been considered guilty of rape.

See also
Sexual Offences Act

English criminal law
Sex crimes in the United Kingdom
United Kingdom Acts of Parliament 1993
Sexuality in the United Kingdom